Gerardus "Gé" Regter (March 6, 1916 in Rotterdam – August 4, 1987 in The Hague) was a Dutch water polo player who competed in the 1936 Summer Olympics. He was part of the Dutch team which finished fifth in the 1936 tournament. He played all seven matches.

References

1916 births
1987 deaths
Dutch male water polo players
Water polo players at the 1936 Summer Olympics
Olympic water polo players of the Netherlands
Sportspeople from Rotterdam
20th-century Dutch people